Kepler-39 (2MASS J19475046+4602034) is an F-type main sequence star located in the constellation Cygnus. It is located about 3,560 light-years (1,090 parsecs) away. One known substellar companion orbits it, Kepler-39b.

Planetary system
Kepler-39b is generally considered a brown dwarf rather than a planet since it does not meet the standard definition of planet. Some authorities such as the Extrasolar Planets Encyclopaedia and the NASA Exoplanet Archive include it among their list of confirmed planets.

References

Cygnus (constellation)
F-type subgiants
Planetary transit variables
423
Planetary systems with one confirmed planet
J19475046+4602034